National Commission for Scheduled Tribes (NCST) is an Indian constitutional body that was established through Constitution (89th Amendment) Act, 2003.

History
On the 89th Amendment of the Constitution coming into force on 19 February 2004, the National Commission for scheduled Tribes has been set up under Article 338A on bifurcation of erstwhile National Commission for Scheduled Castes and Scheduled Tribes to oversee the implementation of various safeguards provided to Scheduled Tribes under the Constitution.

With this amendment, the erstwhile National Commission for Scheduled Castes and Scheduled Tribes was replaced by two separate Commissions namely- (i) The National Commission for Scheduled Castes (NCSC), and (ii) The National Commission for Scheduled Tribes (NCST).

The First commission was constituted in 2004 with Kunwar Singh as the chairperson.

The second commission was constituted in 2007 with Urmila Singh as the Chairperson.

The third Commission was constituted in 2010 with Rameshwar Oraon as the Chairperson.

The fourth Commission was constituted in November 2013 with Rameshwar Oraon getting re-appointed as the Chairperson. Shri Ravi Thakur, MLA in Himachal Pradesh Assembly has been appointed as Vice-Chairperson of the fourth Commission.
The present chairman of NCST is Harsha Chauhan.

Composition
The Commission comprises a Chairperson, a Vice-Chairperson and three full-time Members (including one female Member). The term of all the Members of the Commission is three years from the date of assumption of charge.

Functions
The following are the functions of the commission:

To investigate and monitor all matters relating to the safeguards provided for the Scheduled Tribes  under the Constitution or under any other law for the time being in force or under any order of the Government and to evaluate the working of such safeguards;
To inquire into specific complaints with respect to the deprivation of rights and safeguards of the Scheduled Tribes;
To participate and advise in the planning process of socio-economic development of the Scheduled Tribes and to evaluate the progress of their development under the Union and any State;
To present to the President, annually and at such other times as the Commission may deem fit, reports upon the working of those safeguards;
To make in such reports, recommendations as to the measures that should be taken by the Union or any State for effective implementation of those safeguards and other measures for the protection, welfare and socio-economic development of the Scheduled Tribes, and
To discharge such other functions in relation to the protection, welfare and development and advancement of the Scheduled Tribes as the President may, subject to the provisions of any law made by Parliament, by rule specify.
The Commission would also discharge the following other functions in relation to the protection, welfare and development & advancement of the Scheduled Tribes, namely:- 
Measures that need to be taken over conferring ownership rights in respect of minor forest produce to the Scheduled Tribes living in forest areas.
Measures to be taken to safeguard rights to the Tribal Communities over mineral resources, water resources etc. as per law.
Measures to be taken for the development of tribals and to work for move viable livelihood strategies.
Measures to be taken to improve the efficacy of relief and rehabilitation measures for tribal groups displaced by development projects.
Measures to be taken to prevent alienation of tribal people from land and to effectively rehabilitate such people in whose case alienation has already taken place.
Measures to be taken to elicit maximum cooperation and involvement of Tribal Communities for protecting forests and undertaking social afforestation.
Measures to be taken to ensure full implementation of the Provisions of Panchayats (Extension to Scheduled Areas) Act, 1996.
Measures to be taken to reduce and ultimately eliminate the practice of shifting cultivation by Tribals that lead to their continuous disempowerment and degradation of land and the environment.

List of Chairpersons

See also
National Commission for Backward Classes
National Commission for Scheduled Castes

References

External links

Indian commissions and inquiries
Adivasi
2004 establishments in Delhi
Government agencies established in 2004